Märkisch-Oderland – Barnim II is an electoral constituency (German: Wahlkreis) represented in the Bundestag. It elects one member via first-past-the-post voting. Under the current constituency numbering system, it is designated as constituency 59. It is located in eastern Brandenburg, comprising the Märkisch-Oderland district and southern parts of the Barnim district.

Märkisch-Oderland – Barnim II was created for the 2002 federal election. Since 2021, it has been represented by Simona Koß of the Social Democratic Party (SPD).

Geography
Märkisch-Oderland – Barnim II is located in eastern Brandenburg. As of the 2021 federal election, it comprises the entirety of the Märkisch-Oderland district and the municipalities of Ahrensfelde, Bernau bei Berlin, Panketal, and Werneuchen from the Barnim district.

History
Märkisch-Oderland – Barnim II was created in 2002 and contained parts of the abolished constituencies of Eberswalde – Bernau – Bad Freienwalde and Fürstenwalde – Strausberg – Seelow. In the 2002 and 2005 elections, it was constituency 59 in the numbering system. In the 2009 election, it was number 60. Since the 2013 election, it has been number 59.

Originally, the constituency comprised the districts of Märkisch-Oderland and the municipalities of Ahrensfelde, Bernau bei Berlin, Wandlitz, and Werneuchen and Ämter of Pakental, Biesenthal-Barnim from the Barnim district. Upon the abolition of the Panketal Amt ahead of the 2005 election, the former municipality of Börnicke was transferred out of the constituency. At the same time, it gained the Marienwerder and the former municipality of Zerpenschleuse. In the 2017 election, the municipality of Wandlitz and the Biesenthal-Barnim Amt were transferred out of the constituency.

Members
The constituency was first represented by Petra Bierwirth of the Social Democratic Party (SPD) from 2002 to 2009. The Left won the constituency in 2009, and represented by Dagmar Enkelmann. The Christian Democratic Union (CDU)'s candidate Hans-Georg von der Marwitz was elected in 2013, and re-elected in 2017. Simona Koß regained it for the SPD in 2021.

Election results

2021 election

2017 election

2013 election

2009 election

References

Federal electoral districts in Brandenburg
1990 establishments in Germany
Constituencies established in 1990